Matthew Durrans (born 10 December 1998) is a Canadian professional soccer player who plays as a forward for Austrian Bundesliga club Austria Klagenfurt.

Club career

Early career
Durrans began playing youth soccer at the age of three with West Van SC. He later played with Mountain United SC, later joining the Vancouver Whitecaps FC Academy. At the age of 14, Durrans moved to Germany and joined the academy of 1860 Munich. After spells away with FC Deisenhofen and Regionalliga Bayern side VfR Garching, Durrans returned to 1860 Munich in January 2019, signing a professional contract in August 2020. On 12 December 2020, he made his professional first team debut in the 3. Liga, coming on as a substitute in a 5–0 win over Waldhof Mannheim.

FC Edmonton
On 6 July 2021, Durrans returned to Canada, signing with Canadian Premier League side FC Edmonton.

Pipinsried
On 31 January 2022, Durrans signed with Regionalliga Bayern side FC Pipinsried. However, he only managed to play three games for the German club before being forced to spend the rest of the season on the sidelines, due to an Achilles tendon injury.

Austria Klagenfurt 
After recovering from his injury and spending time on trial with Austria Klagenfurt, Durrans joined the Austrian club officially on 5 January 2023, signing a contract until June 2024.

Career statistics

References

External links

Living people
1998 births
Canadian soccer players
Soccer players from Vancouver
Association football forwards
VfR Garching players
TSV 1860 Munich II players
TSV 1860 Munich players
FC Edmonton players
FC Pipinsried players
SK Austria Klagenfurt players
3. Liga players
Regionalliga players
Oberliga (football) players
Canadian Premier League players
Canadian expatriate soccer players
Expatriate footballers in Germany
Canadian expatriate sportspeople in Germany
Expatriate footballers in Austria
Canadian expatriate sportspeople in Austria